Macula is a term used by archaeologists to describe small two-dimensional features of ancient human origin visible on an aerial photograph, such as points, spots or patches, which may represent features such as burial places, pits, Grubenhäuser (homesteads with sunken floors), constructions based on posthole or features above ground level. Maculae are differentiated  from other features visible in aerial photographs such as enclosures, linear features and linear systems, which include path, roads, boundaries or limits. Identification and interpretation of maculae in air photographs is difficult and depends upon the experience of the observer, who has to take factors such as shape, size, relative position or proximity to other maculae, ground condition and knowledge of cultural practices of ancient humans in the region under observation, into account.

The term is used in a different context in art on objects where it refers to the mesh of a net (in singular), or its depiction, the plural being maculae.

References

Archaeological features